Capilano Lake is a manmade lake located in the District of North Vancouver and West Vancouver in British Columbia, Canada.

History 

The lake accounts for approximately 40% of Greater Vancouver's water supply. The southern part of the lake is within the Capilano River Regional Park; it is also in this area that the lake is separated from the Capilano River's southern portion by the Cleveland Dam.

In popular culture 
Capilano Lake is portrayed as the fictional Highland Beach, Washington in The 4400 television program, as well as Lake Okobogee in a season one episode of the X-Files.

See also
Capilano River
Capilano River Regional Park
Cleveland Dam

References

External links
Metro Vancouver Regional District - Seymour Capilano Filtration Project Brochure

North Vancouver (district municipality)
West Vancouver
Mountain lakes
Lakes of the Lower Mainland
Reservoirs in British Columbia
New Westminster Land District